Bonnie Westlin (born ) is an American politician representing District 42 in the Minnesota Senate since 2023. She lives in Plymouth, Minnesota.

References 

Living people
1960s births
21st-century American women politicians
Women state legislators in Minnesota
Democratic Party Minnesota state senators
People from Plymouth, Minnesota